The Union of Private Sector Professionals (Erto; formerly Federation of Special Service and Clerical Employees) is a trade union representing a variety of private sector professionals.

The federation was founded in 1968, as the General Staff Union, and was affiliated to the Confederation of Salaried Employees (TVK). The TVK went bankrupt in 1992, and the union transferred to the Finnish Confederation of Professionals. By 1998, it had about 20,000 members.

All members of the federation belong to one of its six affiliated unions:

 Accounting Professionals
 Digital Media, Marketing Communications and Information Professionals
 Finnish Optometrists' Union
 ET Specialists
 Logistics Agents' Union
 Private Social and Health Care Professionals

Presidents
1970: Matti Hellsten
2002: Antti Rinne
2005: Tapio Huttula
2011: Juri Aaltonen

References

External links

Trade unions established in 1968
Trade unions in Finland